The Fernaine (alternate spellings include Fernainé, Ferneineh, Ferneini, Fernainy) family is a prominent Antiochian Greek-Orthodox Christian Lebanese family. It is one of the original Beirut aristocratic “Eight Families” along with the Bustros, Abou Saleh , Dagher, Fayad, Sursock, Trad, Merhie and Tueni families, who constituted the traditional high society of Beirut for a long time. Estate holders and feudal lords by origin, today they are business owners, physicians, artists, and philanthropists in Lebanon and abroad.

The land formerly owned by the Ferneini family, along with the rest of the 7 Families, was concentrated in the district of Beirut known as Achrafieh. Under the French Mandate, the land was partitioned to build roads and highways during the 1930s, and eventually, the families were forced to sell vast amounts of their land.

The Greek Orthodox Annunciation Church (église de l'Annonciation) in Achrafieh was built by Negib Ferneini in 1927. Negib had been forced to emigrate to Egypt during World War I to escape the Ottomans, and upon his return he offered a piece of his land to have the church built. "Rue Fernaine" in Achrafieh is named after him.

References 

Lebanese families